Cleveland is a city in Bolivar County, Mississippi, United States. The population was 11,199 as of the 2020 United States Census.

Cleveland has a large commercial economy, with numerous restaurants, stores, and services along U.S. 61. Cleveland is one of the two county seats of Bolivar County (the other being Rosedale) Cleveland is also home to Delta State University and The Grammy Museum Mississippi, the first Grammy Museum outside of Los Angeles.

History
Named after President Grover Cleveland, the town began formation in 1869 as people moved inland from the Mississippi River. The Louisville, New Orleans & Texas Railroad ran through the town and a portion of the railroad remains there today. Early records show the community was called Fontaine in 1884 and at some point Coleman's Station. Moses W. Coleman built the first home on the bayou in the area. In 1885, it was officially named Sims after Rueben T. Sims, who owned part of the land on which the town stood. The village of Cleveland was chartered on March 25, 1886, and the United States Post Office recognized the town as such on August 5, 1887. It was Sims's son, B.C. Sims, who was responsible for the name change to Cleveland.

The town grew steadily and by 1901 Cleveland was named the second county seat and a new courthouse was erected. Bolivar County is one of ten counties in Mississippi with two judicial districts.

As more trees were cleared, more land was put into cultivation. In the early days, all of the planting and harvesting was done by hand. At the end of WWI, African Americans left Bolivar County in great numbers, but many stayed, becoming tenant farmers. There was an increasing demand for labor and Delta planters began to recruit overseas. Today, in addition to the first settlers of English, Scottish, German, Irish, and African descent, Bolivar County is its own “melting pot” of ethnicities.

The African-American influence in Cleveland's history is quite evident. Nearby Dockery Plantation is designated with a Mississippi Blues Trail marker declaring the location as the probable “Birthplace of the Blues.” Many of the early Delta Bluesmen lived and worked around Dockery, influencing each other and educating the next generation.

In the early 1920s, as the State Legislature considered a location for a new Normal college, Cleveland became the obvious choice due to its central Delta location, the railroad, and the donation of land. However, perhaps the most important factor in the equation was the City leaders’ willingness to relocate the infamous Black Bear Saloon that was located between the depot and the soon-to-be Delta Normal College, now Delta State University. In the early 1950s city leaders were able to attract Baxter Laboratories and Mississippi Power & Light’s Delta Steam Electric Station just north of town. The population of Cleveland basically doubled over the following decade.

In 1967, Senators Robert F. Kennedy and Joseph S. Clark Jr. began Senate hearings to assess the effectiveness of the War on Poverty programs.  The first field hearings were held in Jackson, Mississippi, and the following day Kennedy and Clark set out to visit "pockets of poverty" in the Mississippi Delta.  They arrived in Cleveland, along with Marian Wright and Peter Edelman, for a tour conducted by Amzie Moore.  There they observed barefoot, underfed African-American children in tattered clothing, with vacant expressions and distended bellies. Kennedy told Edelman that he thought he had seen the worst poverty in the nation in West Virginia, but it paled in comparison to the poverty he observed in Cleveland.

Most recently, the City of Cleveland and Bolivar County, partnering with DSU, was able to see the realization of the Grammy Museum adjacent to Delta State’s campus. It is the most technologically advanced music museum in the world.

Cleveland is also home to the Railroad Heritage Museum, housing the largest O gauge model layout in the southeast, thousands of railroad artifacts, and a 1941 Illinois Central caboose, all paying tribute to Cleveland's railroad beginnings. The Mississippi Delta Chinese Heritage Museum is located on the third floor of the Delta State Archives & Museum. The Boo Ferriss Baseball Museum, located beside the DSU baseball stadium, honors the late Red Sox pitcher and Hall of Famer, Boo Ferriss, a Shaw, Miss. native and legendary coach at DSU. The Amzie Moore House is the actual home of the late Civil Rights leader, which has been preserved and converted into a museum, paying tribute to his efforts. The home has also been designated as a stop on the Freedom Trail.

Geography and climate

U.S. Route 61 (N-S) and route 8 (E-W) are the main highways serving Cleveland. Jones Bayou and the old Illinois Central Railroad pass through the city from south to north.

Demographics

2020 census

As of the 2020 United States Census, there were 11,199 people, 4,266 households, and 2,611 families residing in the city.

Arts and culture

Mississippi Blues Trail
Four Mississippi Blues Trail markers are located in Cleveland.  The first marker recognizes Chrisman Street, which once served as the center of African-American business and social life in Cleveland.  The second marker celebrates blues musician W. C. Handy. The third marker is located at the Grammy Museum Mississippi. The fourth marker recognizes Rev. C.L. Franklin, who preached at St. Peter's Rock M.B. Church here, influenced gospel, R&B and blues artists, and his daughters Aretha, Erma and Carolyn became noted soul singers after starting out singing in church.

Education

Colleges and universities
 Delta State University

Bolivar County residents have residency for two community colleges: Coahoma Community College and Mississippi Delta Community College. Their main campuses respectively are in unincorporated Coahoma County and Moorhead in Sunflower County.

Primary and secondary schools
The City of Cleveland is served by the Cleveland School District. Schools within the Cleveland city limits include:
 Cleveland Central High School – Formed in mid-2017 by the consolidation of Cleveland High School and East Side High School, occupying the former Cleveland High School and Margaret Green Junior High School.
Cleveland Central Middle School – Formed in mid-2017 by the consolidation of D.M. Smith Middle School and Margaret Green Junior High School, located at the former East Side High School campus.
 Elementary schools
 Nailor Elementary School
 Cypress Parks Elementary School
 Pearman Elementary School
 Parks Elementary School
D. M. Smith Elementary

Other:
 Alternative School
 Cleveland Voc Tech Complex

Private schools
K-12: Bayou Academy
K-6: Presbyterian Day School

Previously ethnic Chinese students were required to attend separate schools, something that persisted into the 1940s. The Chinese Mission School educated them. This building was demolished in 2003.

Media

Newspapers
 The Bolivar Bullet
 The Bolivar Commercial (Defunct)
 The Cleveland News Leader (Defunct)
 The Cleveland Current (Defunct)

Television
 Channel 8, WHCQ-LD
 Channel 17, WXVT-LD

FM radio
	
 88.1 WDSW-LP: (Cleveland, Delta State University)  Adult Album Alternative|Americana (music)|Blues
 98.3 WBYB (FM): Oldies

Infrastructure

Police services
The city of Cleveland is served and protected by the Cleveland Police Department and is located on South Sharpe Avenue. Currently, 45 people are employed by the department. Of the 45, 39 are sworn police officers and six civilians serve in a support role. Sworn officers average out to one officer per 357 citizens.

Fire services
The Cleveland Volunteer Fire Department is currently rated Class 4 by the State Rating Bureau and has three paid employees and 37 volunteer fire fighters. The paid employees include a Fire Inspector, Maintenance Engineer and Maintenance Assistant. All other positions are volunteer. The department operates from three separate fire stations, including a new station at the Cleveland Municipal Airport that opened in late 2011 and utilizes four front line pumpers, two rescue/utility vehicles, an aerial platform pumper, an airport/crash rescue truck, one Ford F-2500 with a bed mounted deluge gun, a Hazardous Materials Response Unit and one backup pumper for its daily operations. The department also operates a training facility that is home to a rope rescue tower, smoke house, ventilation simulator, confined space maze, drafting pit, and a Class A burn facility.

Health care
Bolivar Medical Center is a hospital in Cleveland with emergency services.

Notable people
Bobby Bradford – jazz trumpeter, cornetist, bandleader, and composer
Amzie Moore – Civil rights activist
Walter Rhodes –  blues accordionist and singer
Bobbie L. Steele – 32nd president of Chicago's Cook County Board of Commissioners
Larry Speakes – acting spokesman for the White House under President Ronald Reagan
Professional baseball players:
 Dave Ferriss
 Chet "Chick" Morgan
 Josh Hancock
 Kevin Rogers
Professional football players:
 Shane Matthews
 Floyd Womack
 Pat Coleman
 Ken Lucas
 John Eubanks
 Lou Rash
 Johnny O'Bryant III – professional basketball player
 Margaret Wade – Basketball Hall of Fame Coach, namesake of the Wade Trophy

References

Further reading
 History of Cleveland's Jewish community (from the Institute of Southern Jewish Life)

External links

 City of Cleveland
 Cleveland Chamber of Commerce
 Cleveland-Bolivar County Chamber of Commerce/Tourism

 
Cities in Mississippi
Cities in Bolivar County, Mississippi
County seats in Mississippi
Populated places established in 1869
Micropolitan areas of Mississippi
Mississippi Blues Trail
1869 establishments in Mississippi